Lake Township is a township in Roseau County, Minnesota, United States. The population was 2,087 at the 2000 census.  This township was originally called Algoma Township, which bears a name of Indian derivation, "formed by Schoolcraft from Algonquin and goma meaning 'Algonquin waters.' It designates a large district in Canada, bordering Lakes Huron and Superior. The name was changed sometime between 1954 and 1965.

Geography
The township includes the United States exclave of Elm Point.

Demographics
As of the census of 2000, there were 2,087 people, 736 households, and 560 families residing in the township. There were 982 housing units at an average density of 17.0/sq mi (6.6/km2). The racial makeup of the township was 92.43% White, 0.05% African American, 2.44% Native American, 4.07% Asian, and 1.01% from two or more races. Hispanic or Latino of any race were 0.10% of the population.

There were 736 households, out of which 45.7% had children under the age of 18 living with them, 62.8% were married couples living together, 8.0% had a female householder with no husband present, and 23.9% were non-families. 18.3% of all households were made up of individuals, and 3.7% had someone living alone who was 65 years of age or older.  The average household size was 2.84 and the average family size was 3.24.

In the township the population was spread out, with 33.4% under the age of 18, 8.0% from 18 to 24, 32.7% from 25 to 44, 19.8% from 45 to 64, and 6.0% who were 65 years of age or older.  The median age was 31 years. For every 100 females, there were 110.0 males.  For every 100 females age 18 and over, there were 108.4 males.

The median income for a household in the township was $44,034, and the median income for a family was $46,509. Males had a median income of $28,038 versus $24,075 for females. The per capita income of the township was $16,549.  About 3.1% of families and 4.5% of the population were below the poverty line, including 4.4% of those under age 18 and 10.2% of those age 65 or over.

References

Townships in Roseau County, Minnesota
Townships in Minnesota